Boxa is an Australian boxing, mixed martial arts and clothing brand that was founded in Sydney, Australia in 2001. World boxing champion and former professional rugby league footballer Anthony Mundine started the brand as a boxing gloves and helmets company, but it eventually branched out into clothing as well and a Boxa Bar cafe in Hurstville.

The Boxa Bar was destroyed by fire in November 2013. At the time the fire was being investigated by police and being treated as suspicious.

Sponsorships
In addition to Mundine advertising his own company's sportswear, several celebrity athlete friends of Mundine also endorse Boxa products.

Athletes
  Blake Ferguson
  Sonny Bill Williams
  Quade Cooper

National teams
  Alexandria Rovers

See also

 List of fitness wear brands
 List of sporting goods manufacturers
 List of companies of Australia

References

External links
 

Sportswear brands
2001 establishments in Australia
Clothing companies established in 2001
Sporting goods manufacturers of Australia
Clothing brands of Australia
Companies based in Sydney